Before the Dinosaurs is the second studio album by Danish singer-songwriter Aura Dione. The album was released on 4 November 2011 by Universal Music. It was preceded by the lead single, "Geronimo" on 19 September 2011. Upon its release, the album received mixed reviews from most music critics, who compared the singer to Lady Gaga but felt the album was over-produced.

Singles 
"Geronimo" was released as the album's lead single on 19 September 2011. Lyrically, the song is about staying true to yourself and living out your dreams, and is one of Dione's favourite songs on the album. The song was a number one hit in Austria, Denmark and Germany. In Germany, Dione became the first Danish artist to debut at number one.

"Friends" was released as the second single from the album. It was sent for Danish mainstream radio adds on 23 January 2012. The song features German production team Rock Mafia who co-wrote the song with Dione and David Jost. "Friends" was written to let Dione's friends know how precious they are to her. It peaked at number six in Denmark, becoming Dione's third top 10 hit following "Geronimo" (2011) and "Something from Nothing" (2007).

"In Love with the World" was released as the album's third single. Co-written by Rick Nowels, "In Love with the World" is about the sacrifices Dione had to make to pursue her career, and "letting go of someone who loves me, because maybe he doesn't love me enough to let me be free". Aura Dione performed the song for the first time in Denmark on late-night talk show Clement Søndag on 22 April 2012. It impacted Danish radio on 28 May 2012. The song peaked at number five in Denmark.

In October 2012, "Reconnect" was added to Danish radio station DR P3 as the album's fourth single.

Commercial performance 
In Denmark, the album debuted at number 18 after three days of sale. The following week the album rose to number 11. In its thirty-third week on the chart, Before the Dinosaurs peaked at number six. Before the Dinosaurs debuted and peaked at number 36 in Switzerland on 20 November 2011. In its third and final week on the chart, the album fell to number 83. In Austria, the album debuted at number thirty on 18 November 2011. The album has since been certified gold by the International Federation of the Phonographic Industry (IFPI) for shipments of 10,000 copies in Austria. On October 19 it was confirmed, that Dione will release a re-release of her album, including a bonus DVD.

Track listing 
The 12 tracks on the album are listed below.

The special edition contains twelve commentary tracks where Aura Dione talks about each song on the album.

Charts and certifications

Weekly charts

Year-end charts

Certifications

Release history

References

2011 albums
Albums produced by Rick Nowels
Albums produced by Rock Mafia
Island Records albums
Aura Dione albums